Hispanidad is a Spanish term alluding to the group of people, countries, and communities that share the Spanish language and Hispanic culture. The term can have various, different implications and meanings depending on country of origin, socio-political views, and cultural background.

Early use 
It was used, with a similar meaning, in the 1803 edition of the Dictionary of the Spanish Royal Academy as a synonym of Hispanismo (Hispanism), which, in turn, was defined as "the peculiar speech of the Spanish language".

Revival
In the early 20th century, the term was revived, with several new meanings. Its reintroduction is attributed to Unamuno in 1909, who used the term again on 11 March 1910, in an article, La Argentinidad, published in a newspaper in Argentina, La Nación.

Unamuno linked the concept to the multiplicity of peoples speaking the Spanish language, which encompassed in turn his idea of La Raza, gave it an egalitarian substrate and questioned the very status of motherland for Spain; he claimed the need of approaching Hispanic American republics in terms of sisterhood (opposing "primacies" and "maternities").

Further development of the concept had to wait for the 1920s, when a group of intellectuals was influenced by the ideas of ultranationalist French thinker Charles Maurras and rescued the term. The term was used by Spanish priest Zacarías de Vizcarra, who was living in Buenos Aires. He proposed in 1926 that the expression Fiesta de la Raza should be changed to Fiesta de la Hispanidad.

During the reign of King Alfonso XIII of Spain, the Virgin of Guadaloupe was proclaimed "Queen of the Hispanidad" in Spain. In the later years of the decade, vanguard writer Ernesto Giménez Caballero began to elaborate a neo-imperialist narrative of the Hispanidad in La Gaceta Literaria. The doctrine of Hispanidad would also become a core tenet of the reactionary thought in Spain in the coming years.

During the Second Spanish Republic, Spanish monarchist author Ramiro de Maeztu, who had been the ambassador to Argentina between 1928 and 1930, considered the concept of Hispanidad, motivated by the interests aroused on him by Argentine-related topics, and the meetings between him and the attendants to the courses of Catholic culture as nationalist, Catholic and anti-liberal. Maeztu explained his doctrine of Hispanidad in his work Defensa de la Hispanidad (1934); he thought it was a spiritual world that united Spain and its former colonies by the Spanish language and Catholicism. He attributed the concept to Vizcarra, instead of Unamuno. In the Hispanidad of Maeztu, the Christian and humanist features that would identify Hispanic peoples would replace rationalism, liberalism and democracy, which he called alien to the Hispanic ethos. His work "relentlessly" linked Catholicism and Hispanidad and was highly influential with Argentine nationalists and the Spanish far right, including Francoism. Although declaredly anti-racist because of its Catholic origin, the sense of racial egalitarianism in Maeztu's idea of Hispanidad was restricted to the scope of heavenly salvation.

Spanish Primate Isidro Gomá y Tomás issued in Argentina, on 12 October 1934, a Maeztu-inspired manifesto, In Support of Hispanidad:

According to Stephen G. H. Roberts, Gomá linked the ideas of Maeztu and the ideology that was developed by the dictatorship of Franco.

According to the philosopher and writer Julián Marías, the Spanish American territories were not only colonies but also extensions of Spain that mixed with the native American peoples, with whom Europeans intermarried, creating a multicultural society.

Francoist Spain

That narrative was heavily featured in Nationalist propaganda during the Spanish Civil War, being used as war tool. Spanish philosopher and Francoist propagandist  would make Francisco Franco the saviour of the legacy of the Hispanidad from an "invisible army" that was sent by the Communist International of Moscow. García Morente would synthesize the essence of Hispanidad in the archaistic ideal of "Christian knight", half-monk and half-soldier; that figure was used in the pages of student books during the beginning of the Francoist dictatorship.

After the Spanish Civil War, the Our Lady of the Pillar became a symbol of Hispanidad in Spain and was linked to the National Catholicism of the Franco´s regime to the ideas of patriotism and "Hispanic essences".

Franco created the Council of the Hispanidad on 2 November 1940. It was thought at first to be a sort of supranational institution, and it ended up being a council of 74 members, charged with the task of coordinating the relations with Latin America. The Hispanidad became the source of an expansive nationalism (first imperialist and then cultural). Besides its character both as national identity element and as stalwart of Catholicism, Francoism used the Hispanidad in international relations.

That happened within a framework of a general change in the doctrine of the Hispanidad between 1945 and 1947, with Alberto Martín-Artajo at the helm of the Spanish Ministry of Foreign Affairs. The message then became more defensive and less aggressive, with fewer mentions of "empire" and "race" (biological). Afterwards, later in the Francoist dictatorship, the regime, then less constrained by the international community, recovered more aggressive rhetorics, but it failed to reach the full extent of when Ramón Serrano Suñer was Minister of Foreign Affairs.

In 1958, the Day of the Race was renamed to Day of the Hispanidad in Spain.

Mexico
Already in the 1930s, conservative Mexican writer  had become an active propagandist of the Hispanidad. One of the key parts of the ideology of "Panista" Mexican politician , who strongly supported miscegenation, was the Hispanidad, which he conceived in terms of a united community of sovereign states that defended their own values from foreign threats like communism. The National Synarchist Union saw in the Hispanidad a key component of the vitality of the Mexican nation.

Spanish exiles 
The idea of Hispanidad was also featured with new meanings in authors of the Spanish Republic in exile, such as Fernando de los Ríos, Joaquín Xirau, Eduardo Nicol and Américo Castro. Salvador de Madariaga, also exiled, defended the Hispanidad as a positive factor towards cultural ontogeny; he believed its miscegenation was much better than the Anglo-Saxon example.

Argentina
In Argentina, one of the few countries with good relations with Francoist Spain after the end of World War II, President Juan Domingo Perón defended the concept of Hispanidad by highlighting the Hispanic roots of Argentina.

Other countries
In Colombia,  used the idea of Hispanidad in his work.
In Chile, Jaime Eyzaguirre would do the same. In Peru, diplomat Víctor Andrés Belaúnde held that Peru was essentially a mestizo and Spanish nation and due to this its people "gravitated" towards what was "Hispanic".

See also 
 Hispanismo
Panhispanism
 Traditionalist conservatism
 Breve Historia de México
 Spanish-speaking world

References

Sources 
 
 
 
 
 
 
 
 
 
 
 
 
 
 
 
 
 
 
 
 
 
 
 
 
 
 
 
 
 
 
 
 
 
 
 
 
 
 
 
 
 
 

 

Foreign relations of Spain during the Francoist dictatorship